Proboscidea spicata, the New Mexico unicorn-plant, is a herbaceous, flowering plant.

Distribution
Proboscidea spicata occurs in southwest regions of Texas, and southeastern parts of New Mexico.

Habitat and ecology
Proboscidea spicata is adapted to live in dry, sandy soil. This plant does not need much water to survive. It prefers alluvial soils. Its native to areas such as New Mexico and Texas. It is a critically imperiled species.

Morphology
Proboscidea spicata has a vine like appearance. The stems of this flower are sticky and covered in hairs.

Flowers and fruit
Flowers of Proboscidea spicata have five petals that are purple. They have bright yellow pistils.

References
 
 https://books.google.com/books?id=pM-UVgc-BDkC&pg=PA409&lpg=PA409&dq=Proboscidea+spicata&source=bl&ots=ypk-nRQBcm&sig=qAYfxHeFsyj3SjuV_lvhRbfdqZI&hl=en&sa=X&ved=0ahUKEwjInprT8-DTAhXizIMKHbHQATQQ6AEIVjAL#v=onepage&q=Proboscidea%20spicata&f=false  
 http://explorer.natureserve.org/servlet/NatureServe?sourceTemplate=tabular_report.wmt&loadTemplate=species_RptComprehensive.wmt&selectedReport=RptComprehensive.wmt&summaryView=tabular_report.wmt&elKey=135315&paging=home&save=true&startIndex=1&nextStartIndex=1&reset=false&offPageSelectedElKey=135315&offPageSelectedElType=species&offPageYesNo=true&post_processes=&radiobutton=radiobutton&selectedIndexes=135315

Martyniaceae